Bishop Stopford School is a secondary school and sixth form with academy status in Kettering, Northamptonshire, England.

The school is located in the Headlands, Kettering. The current headteacher is Jill Silverthorne. Former students of Bishop Stopford are known as Old Stopfordians.

History
Bishop Stopford School was founded in 1965 as a purpose-built Secondary Modern institution, as a replacement for its precursor, a school founded in 1535 by the rector of St Peter and St Paul's Church, Kettering. The former bishop of Peterborough, Robert Stopford, agreed to the new school being named after him. Bishop Stopford School soon introduced a sixth form and admitted its first fully comprehensive intake in 1976.

On 23 May 2012, Bishop Stopford opened an extension to the sixth-form, with a study area, two seminar rooms and an additional classroom.

The number on roll has more than doubled since 1965 to approximately 1450 students, with a sixth form of approximately 400.

The school converted to academy status in August 2011.

Previous headteachers were James Colquhoun until 2001, and Margaret Holman from 2001 to 2018.

Sixth form
Bishop Stopford School Sixth Form has approximately 400 students and offers 30 subjects.

School performance and inspections

Before the school became an academy, its last full inspection by Ofsted was in 2008, with a judgement of Outstanding. The report noted that the school "serves an area which is mostly socially and economically advantaged".

References

External links
 Bishop Stopford School
 The Woodard Corporation - Church of England Schools

Academies in North Northamptonshire
Woodard Schools
Church of England secondary schools in the Diocese of Peterborough
Educational institutions established in the 1530s
1535 establishments in England
Secondary schools in North Northamptonshire